MTH may refer to:

 Florida Keys Marathon Airport, US, IATA airport code
 MTH Electric Trains, toy train manufacturer
 MTH Racing engines, Austrian manufacturer

See also
 M.Th., Master of Theology